Poecilus is a genus of ground beetle native to the Afro-tropical region, the Palearctic (including Europe), the Near East, and North Africa.

It contains the following species:

 Poecilus abditus Lutshnik, 1934
 Poecilus advena Quensel, 1806
 Poecilus aegyptius (Tschitscherine, 1897)
 Poecilus aeneolus (Chaudoir, 1868)
 Poecilus aerarius (Coquerel, 1859)
 Poecilus affinissimus (Ali, 1967)
 Poecilus akinini Tschitscherine, 1887
 Poecilus alexandrae Tschitscherine, 1889
 Poecilus alutaceus (Tschitscherine, 1893)
 Poecilus anatolicus (Chaudoir, 1850)
 Poecilus anodon (Chaudoir, 1868)
 Poecilus aralensis Glasunov, 1909
 Poecilus aztecus (Tschitscherine, 1897)
 Poecilus baeticus Rambur, 1838
 Poecilus balassogloi (Tschitscherine, 1887)
 Poecilus batesianus Lutshnik, 1916
 Poecilus beesoni (Andrewes, 1927)
 Poecilus bokori Csiki, 1930
 Poecilus bonvoisini (Reiche & Saulcy, 1855)
 Poecilus carbonicolor Solsky, 1874
 Poecilus chalcites (Say, 1823)
 Poecilus chinensis Jedlicka, 1962
 Poecilus coarctatus Lucas, 1842
 Poecilus coloradensis (Csiki, 1930)
 Poecilus corvus (LeConte, 1837)
 Poecilus crenatus (Dejean, 1828)
 Poecilus crenulatus Dejean, 1828
 Poecilus crenuliger Chaudoir, 1876
 Poecilus crimeanus Straneo, 1960
 Poecilus cupreus Linne, 1758
 Poecilus cursitor LeConte, 1852
 Poecilus cursorius Dejean, 1828
 Poecilus curtonotoides Kabak, 1997
 Poecilus cyanicolor Chaudoir, 1876
 Poecilus decipiens Wallt, 1835
 Poecilus diplophryus Chaudoir, 1876
 Poecilus dissors (Tschitscherine, 1893)
 Poecilus effrenus (Lutshnik, 1930)
 Poecilus encopoleus Solsky, 1873
 Poecilus excellens (Tschitscherine, 1895)
 Poecilus exilicaudis Kabak, 1998
 Poecilus festivus (Chaudoir, 1868)
 Poecilus fortipes (Chaudoir, 1850)
 Poecilus gaturs (Davies, 2004)
 Poecilus gebleri (Dejean, 1828)
 Poecilus gobiensis (Jedlicka, 1968)
 Poecilus gonioderus (Tschitscherine, 1901)
 Poecilus gotschii (Chaudoir, 1846)
 Poecilus grombczewskyi (Tschitscherine, 1890)
 Poecilus grumi (Tschitscherine, 1898)
 Poecilus gurjevae Kabak, 1994
 Poecilus hafezi Morvan, 1975
 Poecilus hanhaicus (Tschitscherine, 1894)
 Poecilus houskai (Jedlicka, 1952)
 Poecilus ilgazdensis Jedlicka, 1961
 Poecilus innatus Glasunov, 1909
 Poecilus iranicus (Morvan, 1974)
 Poecilus isfanensis Kabak, 1998
 Poecilus ispulensis Kabak, 1994
 Poecilus jacutorum Poppius, 1904
 Poecilus janthinipennis Solsky, 1874
 Poecilus kabulensis (Jedlicka, 1956)
 Poecilus kaschgaricus (Jedlicka, 1957)
 Poecilus kekesiensis Nyilas, 1993
 Poecilus kizbaiensis Kabak, 1994
 Poecilus korbi (Tschitschcrine, 1893)
 Poecilus koyi Germar, 1824
 Poecilus kozlovi Tschitscherine, 1903
 Poecilus kraatzii (Heyden, 1882)
 Poecilus kugelanni (Panzer, 1797)
 Poecilus laetulus (LeConte, 1863)
 Poecilus laevicollis Chaudoir, 1842
 Poecilus laevigatus (L. Dufour, 1820)
 Poecilus lamproderus (Chaudoir, 1868)
 Poecilus lepidus (Leske, 1785)
 Poecilus leptoderus Solsky, 1874
 Poecilus liosomus Chaudoir, 1876
 Poecilus longiventris Solsky, 1874
 Poecilus lucasii (Reiche, 1861)
 Poecilus lucublandus (Say, 1823)
 Poecilus major Motschulsky, 1844
 Poecilus melanochrous (Tschitscherine, 1901)
 Poecilus mesembrinus Tschitscherine, 1896
 Poecilus mexicanus Chaudoir, 1876
 Poecilus mongoliensis (Jedlicka, 1962)
 Poecilus muchei (Jedlicka, 1961)
 Poecilus nemotoi (Straneo, 1989)
 Poecilus nigripalpis (Jedlicka, 1963)
 Poecilus nitens (Chaudoir, 1850)
 Poecilus nitidicollis Motschulsky, 1844
 Poecilus nitidus (Dejean, 1828)
 Poecilus occidentalis (Dejean, 1828)
 Poecilus oirat Kabak, 1994
 Poecilus ovtshinnikovi Kabak, 1994
 Poecilus pantanellii A. Fiori, 1903
 Poecilus peregrinus (Tschitscherine, 1898)
 Poecilus pertusus (Schaum, 1858)
 Poecilus pharao (Lutshnik, 1916)
 Poecilus polychromus Tschitscherine, 1889
 Poecilus prasinotinctus (Csiki, 1930)
 Poecilus pseudopurpurascens (Kirschenhofer, 1987)
 Poecilus pucholti (Jedlicka, 1962)
 Poecilus puer Kabak, 1997
 Poecilus punctibasis (Chaudoir, 1868)
 Poecilus puncticollis (Dejean, 1828)
 Poecilus punctulatus Schaller, 1783
 Poecilus purpurascens (Dejean, 1828)
 Poecilus quadricollis (Dejean, 1828)
 Poecilus ravus Lutshnik, 1922
 Poecilus rebeli (Apfelbeck, 1904)
 Poecilus reflexicollis Gebler, 1832
 Poecilus reicheianus (Peyron, 1858)
 Poecilus rostowtzowi (Tschitscherine, 1899)
 Poecilus samojedorum J.R. Sahlberg, 1880
 Poecilus samurai (Lutshnik, 1916)
 Poecilus schamsiensis (Poppius, 1908)
 Poecilus scitulus LeConte, 1848
 Poecilus sericeus Fischer von Waldheim, 1824
 Poecilus slivkini Kabak, 1994
 Poecilus soederbomi (Jedlicka, 1935)
 Poecilus songinus (Jedlicka, 1968)
 Poecilus spectus (Jedlicka, 1962)
 Poecilus stenoderus (Chaudoir, 1846)
 Poecilus striatopunctatus (Duftschmid, 1812)
 Poecilus subcoeruleus (Quensel, 1806)
 Poecilus subsimilis (Tschitscherine, 1893)
 Poecilus syriensis (Jedlicka, 1957)
 Poecilus szepligetii Csiki, 1908
 Poecilus tarimensis Tschitscherine, 1896
 Poecilus tengrensis Jedlicka, 1960
 Poecilus texanus (LeConte, 1863)
 Poecilus timuri Kabak, 1994
 Poecilus toxanbaicus Kabak, 1990
 Poecilus tschitscherini (Semenov, 1891)
 Poecilus turkestanicus Reitter, 1891
 Poecilus urgens Tschitscherine, 1898
 Poecilus uygur Kabak, 1997
 Poecilus versicolor (Sturm, 1824)
 Poecilus vicinus Levrat, 1858
 Poecilus vicinus Levrat, 1858
 Poecilus wollastoni (Wollaston, 1854)
 Poecilus zaballosi Jeanne & Ruiz-Tapiador, 1996
 Poecilus zhicharevi Lutshnik, 1933

References

External links
Poecilus at Fauna Europaea

Pterostichinae
Taxa named by Franco Andrea Bonelli